Bekezela Moyo (born 9 February 1985) is a Zimbabwean cricketer. He made his first-class debut for Centrals cricket team in the 2008–09 Logan Cup on 24 March 2009.

References

External links
 

1985 births
Living people
Zimbabwean cricketers
Centrals cricketers
Sportspeople from Harare